The Dutch Draft, is a Dutch breed of heavy draft horse. It is of cold-blood type, massively built and calm in temperament; it has good stamina. It derives from cross-breeding of local Zeeland mares with the Belgian Ardennes and Brabant breeds, to which it is very similar.

History 

The Dutch Draft was created in the years after the First World War by cross-breeding the heavy draft mares of the province of Zeeland with Ardennes and Brabant stock from neighbouring Belgium. Until after the Second World War, it was the most important Dutch horse breed, but with the mechanisation of agriculture, it declined rapidly. In 2009 the breed population was reported to be 1424. There are two breeders' associations for the horse: the Koninklijke Vereniging Het Nederlandse Trekpaard en de Haflinger ("royal association for the Nederlands Trekpaard and the Haflinger") and the Stichting het Werkend Trekpaard Zeeland ("foundation for the working draught horse of Zeeland"); the former was founded in 1914, and received a royal charter in 1948.

Characteristics 

The Dutch Draft is a massive cold-blooded horse, with free movements, a calm temperament and good stamina. The legs are heavily feathered.

References

Further reading 

 Tamsin Pickeral (2001). The Encyclopedia of Horses and Ponies. Parragon Plus, 2001. .
 Susan McBane (1997). The Illustrated Encyclopaedia of Horse Breeds.  Wellfleet Press.

Horse breeds
Horse breeds originating in the Netherlands